Streptogrisin A (Streptomyces griseus protease A, protease A, proteinase A, Streptomyces griseus proteinase A, Streptomyces griseus serine proteinase 3, Streptomyces griseus serine proteinase A) is an enzyme. This enzyme catalyses the following chemical reaction

 Hydrolysis of proteins with specificity similar to chymotrypsin

This enzyme is isolated from Streptomyces griseus.

References

External links 
 

EC 3.4.21